The 2019 New Orleans Privateers baseball team represent the University of New Orleans (UNO) during the 2019 NCAA Division I baseball season. The Privateers play their home games at Maestri Field at Privateer Park as a member of the Southland Conference. They are led by head coach Blake Dean, in his 4th season at UNO.

Preseason

SLC media poll
The SLC media poll was released on February 7, 2019 with the Privateers predicted to finish 7th, the position they finished the past three seasons.

Preseason All-SLC teams

1st Team
Beau Bratton – Catcher

2nd Team
Pearce Howard – Outfielder

Reference:

Personnel

Roster

Reference:

Coaching staff

Reference:

Schedule

All rankings from Collegiate Baseball.

Reference:

References

New Orleans Privateers baseball seasons
New Orleans Privateers
New Orleans Privateers baseball